Alley Cat Allies (incorporated on October 6, 1991) is a nonprofit animal welfare organisation. It advocates for reform of public policies and institutions to better serve the interests of cats. Based in Bethesda, Maryland, the group is best known for introducing trap–neuter–return to the United States.

Alley Cat Allies' emphasis is on stray and feral cat advocacy and providing information on trap–neuter–return, the method of managing feral cat populations that the organization considers humane and effective. The organization helps communities, individuals and grassroots groups launch or improve their Trap-Neuter-Return programs and expand affordable spay and neuter services. Alley Cat Allies also educates the public about the number of cats killed annually in animal shelters and works to reform the shelter system to better serve the needs of feral cats.

Founding
Alley Cat Allies was founded in 1990, by Becky Robinson and Louise Holton after they discovered an alley with 56 cats and two smaller colonies in the Adams Morgan neighborhood of Washington, D.C. They neutered the cats using the trap–neuter–return method. Deluged by requests for help with similar work, and aware of the lack of resources and information on the method, they formed a network for feral cats. Holton left the organization in 2001 to form Alley Cat Rescue.

Robinson serves as the organization's president, running the organization with Chief Operating Officer Charlene Pedrolie. Former Vice President and Board Chair Donna Wilcox joined as full-time staff in 1999 but was forcibly removed in 2018 leading to a series of lawsuits and widespread allegations of mismanagement.

Controversies

Throughout late 2018 a series of exposés by journalist Marc Gunther alleged extensive wrongdoing at Alley Cat Allies. The articles spotlighted governance problems at the charity as well as widespread violation of tax laws. Among the irregularities was the fact that the nonprofit's board was largely negligent – having not met at any point in 2018 – and that Alley Cat Allies had siphoned funds towards third parties that had little to do with its stated mission, including real estate purchases on behalf of its founder, Becky Robinson.

Alley Cat Allies has also faced numerous claims regarding a toxic and inhospitable workplace environment.
 
Alley Cat Allies COO and CFO, Charlene Pedrolie, was widely denounced for her tenure at ACC shelter in Manhattan. During her time at the shelter she was accused of being a "pencil-pushing administrator who ignored... medical advice". During her tenure at Alley Cat Allies, the size of the organization's workforce declined from 44 to less than 10 employees.

Selected history

 Baltimore Trap-Neuter-Return Ordinance – When animal control policies in Baltimore prevented residents from carrying out Trap-Neuter-Return in 2007, Alley Cat Allies educated the city council about Trap-Neuter-Return and helped draft a new ordinance that allowed residents to feed and provide shelter for managed feral cat colonies.
 Hurricane Katrina response – In the wake of Hurricane Katrina in 2005, Alley Cat Allies established a base camp and emergency shelter in Louisiana and sent 150 volunteers to help hundreds of cats displaced by the hurricane.  In 2008, Alley Cat Allies received the Goodwill Key to the City of New Orleans in recognition of their work to save the Gulf region's animals after Hurricane Katrina.
 DC CAT – In 2004, Alley Cat Allies created the DC CAT Trap-Neuter-Return pilot program, which neutered nearly 1,400 cats in Washington, DC. Two years later, DC's animal control organization, the Washington Humane Society, embraced Trap-Neuter-Return as its feral cat policy and together with Alley Cat Allies opened the first high-volume spay/neuter clinic in Washington, DC, in 2007.
 Norfolk Naval Shipyard – In 2000, Alley Cat Allies halted a catch and kill order at Norfolk Naval Shipyard in Portsmouth, Virginia, and instead instituted a Trap-Neuter-Return program, becoming the first animal protection group in the nation to hold a formal contract with the U.S. military.

Programs and projects 

Alley Cat Allies created National Feral Cat Day in 2001  and promotes it every October 16. The day is marked with events such as spay/neuter clinics and workshops. In 2009, Alley Cat Allies celebrated National Feral Cat Day on the CBS Early Show, where weatherman Dave Price joined Alley Cat Allies' "I'm An Alley Cat Ally" campaign. In 2017, the organization changed the name of the event to Global Cat Day.

In 2000, Alley Cat Allies formed a coalition to stop a municipal order to catch and kill cats living on and under Atlantic City's boardwalk. With the city's cooperation, Alley Cat Allies staff and local volunteers began a trap–neuter–return program for the boardwalk cats. The program celebrated its 10th anniversary in June 2010.

Alley Cat Allies' Feral Friends Network connects individuals to organizations, veterinarians, and others serving as resources on feral cats and TNR from around the world.

Research and publications

 Trap-Neuter-Return Ordinances and Policies in the United States: The Future of Animal Control - In 2013, the organization published a document reviewing the treatment of feral cats in ordinances throughout the U.S. The study found that at least 240 local governments had enacted ordinances or policies supporting TNR (p. 4), a ten-fold increase from ten years earlier (p. 11).
 Scientific study of neuter status of U.S. pet cats - In 2009, Alley Cat Allies published Population Characteristics and Neuter Status of Cats Living in Households in the United States in the Journal of the American Veterinary Medical Association. "Findings suggested that a high percentage (80.0%) of cats living in households in the United States were neutered and that annual family income was the strongest predictor of whether cats in the household were neutered."
 U.S. Public Opinion on Humane Treatment of Stray Cats – In 2007, Alley Cat Allies published a document interpreting the results of a survey the organization hired Harris Interactive to conduct. The survey found that 81% of Americans consider it more humane to leave a cat outside where the cat is, rather than have the cat caught and "put down."

See also
 No Kill Equation
 No-kill shelter
 Project Bay Cat, a similar project

References

External links
 

Charities based in Maryland
Domestic cat welfare organizations
Animal charities based in the United States
Trap–neuter–return organizations
Organizations established in 1991
1991 establishments in the United States